This is a list of NCAA Women's Division I Lacrosse Championship bids by school, as of the conclusion of the 2022 tournament. Schools whose names are italicized are not currently in Division I and cannot be included in the tournament. 
There are currently 29 bids for the tournament each year (15 automatic, 14 at-large). Previous sizes include 16 (2001–12), 12 (1983–84, 1998-2000), 8 (1997), 6 (1986–96), 4 (1985), and 2 (1982). The 2020 tournament was cancelled due to the COVID-19 pandemic in the United States.

Play-in games were held from 2004-12. These games are not counted in this list, as the NCAA's record book does not mention them.

Bids

References

NCAA Women's Lacrosse Championship